François-Jacques Guillotte (? Paris – 1766 ?, id.) was an 18th-century French police officer and Encyclopédiste.

Life 
When the Diderot family moved at #6 rue Mouffetard in the Parisian parish of Saint-Médard in April 1746, there lived also François-Jacques Guillotte, a police officer in their vicinity. The two men  became friends, they united their common interest in philosophy and in the development of the society of the Ancien régime.

François-Jacques Guillotte wrote the article Pont militaire (military bridge) for the Encyclopédie by Denis Diderot.

Sources 
 Joseph-Marie Quérard, La France littéraire, t. 5, Paris, Firmin-Didot, 1862, 1833, .

References 

Police officers from Paris
Contributors to the Encyclopédie (1751–1772)
Denis Diderot
18th-century births
1760s deaths